Fred R. Fisher (1871 – August 25, 1959) was a member of the Wisconsin State Senate.

Biography
Fisher was born in Farmington, Waupaca County, Wisconsin in 1871.

Career
Fisher was a member of the Senate from 1939 to 1942. Additionally, he was Mayor of Waupaca from 1936 to 1938, a Waupaca alderman from 1909 to 1912, as well as a school board and county board member. He was a Republican.

He died at the age of 88, and was buried in Waupaca, Wisconsin.

References

External links
 
 The Political Graveyard

People from Waupaca County, Wisconsin
Republican Party Wisconsin state senators
Mayors of places in Wisconsin
Wisconsin city council members
School board members in Wisconsin
1871 births
1959 deaths
Burials in Wisconsin